The siege of Yorktown was the culminating act of the Yorktown campaign, a series of military operations occupying much of 1781 during the American Revolutionary War.  The siege was a decisive Franco-American victory: after the surrender of British Lt. Gen. Charles, Earl Cornwallis on October 17, the government of Lord North fell, and its replacement entered into peace negotiations that resulted in British recognition of American independence with the 1783 Treaty of Paris.

The siege involved land forces from the United States, including the Continental Army and state militias, as well as land forces under French and British command.  The British forces included a large number of troops from various German principalities of the Holy Roman Empire that were collectively known as Hessians.  Since Yorktown, Virginia was specifically selected by Cornwallis for its properties as a deep-water port, both sides had naval support as well: the British forces included some Royal Navy vessels, and the Franco-American allies were supported by a large French fleet, some of whose marines were landed to assist in siege operations.  German historians have noted that approximately one third of all the land forces involved were either hired or recruited from German states, or were German immigrants to America; this has led the siege to be known in German historiography as "die Deutsche Schlacht" ("the German battle").

The following units and commanders of the British, American, and French forces fought in the Siege of Yorktown, or provided significant local support.

British Army
The British Army forces present at Yorktown arrived in Virginia in four separate detachments.  The first was sent from New York City in December 1780 under the command of the turncoat Brigadier General Benedict Arnold.  The second was sent from New York in March 1781 under the command of Major General William Phillips to reinforce Arnold after a Franco-American threat.  The third detachment to arrive was that of General Cornwallis, who had been active in the Carolinas and, following the Battle of Guilford Court House on March 15, decided to join forces with Arnold and Phillips. This was contrary to instructions from his superior, Lieutenant General Sir Henry Clinton, British Commander-in-Chief in North America. He arrived at Petersburg, Virginia in late May to take command of the troops there; Phillips had died of a fever just a week before, and Arnold returned to New York not long after Cornwallis arrived.  While at Petersburg, Cornwallis was joined by a fourth detachment from New York that was under the command of the Hessian Colonel August von Voigt.

With this force, numbering about 7,200, Cornwallis first chased after the army of the Marquis de Lafayette, a much smaller force of Continental Army and local militiamen that had provided some resistance to the movements of Phillips and Arnold.  Cornwallis was eventually ordered by General Clinton to establish a fortified deep-water port at either Yorktown or Portsmouth.  Cornwallis chose Yorktown, and began constructing fortifications there and Gloucester Point, just across the York River from Yorktown, in August 1781.

British forces 
Commander: Lt. Gen. Charles, Earl Cornwallis, commanding

 Headquarters
 Staff
 Troop from 17th Regiment of (Light) Dragoons, incorporated into British Legion (elements opposite Yorktown in Gloucester)
 Royal Marines Infantry

 Artillery
 Royal Regiment of Artillery (plus detachments of sailors manning guns from scuttled ships) (167 men all of ranks (from RA)
Detachments from No.1 Company, 4th Battalion, RA
Detachments from No.2 Co, 4th Btn , RA
No.6 Co, 4th Btn, RA
Detachments from No.8 Co, 4th Btn, RA
Hesse-Hanau Artillery Company

 Brigade of Foot Guards commanded by Brig. Gen. Charles O'Hara
 1st Battalion, 1st Regiment of Foot Guards (two companies of grenadiers, as opposed to one)
 1st Consolidated Battalion
 2nd Consolidated Battalion

 Light Infantry Brigade commanded by Lt. Col. Robert Abercromby
 1st Battalion (Light companies from the 4th, 7th, 15th, 17th, 23rd, 27th, 33rd, and 38th Foot)
 2nd Battalion (Light companies from the 37th, 43rd, 45th, 49th, 55th, 63rd, and 71st Foot)
 82nd Regiment of Foot
 1st Brigade commanded by Lt. Col. John Yorke
17th Regiment of Foot
23rd Regiment of Foot (Royal Welch Fuzileers)
33rd Regiment of Foot
 2nd Battalion, 71st Regiment of Foot (Fraser's Highlanders)
 2nd Brigade commanded by Lt. Col. Thomas Dundas
43rd Regiment of Foot
 76th Regiment of Foot (MacDonald's Highlanders)
 80th Regiment of Foot (Royal Edinburgh Volunteers)

German contingents
 Ansbach-Bayreuth Contingent under Col. August von Voigt
 1st Ansbach-Bayreuth Regiment
 2nd Ansbach-Bayreuth Regiment
 Ansbach-Bayreuth Artillery Company
 Hesse-Kassel Contingent under Lt. Col. Matthew von Fuchs
 Erbprinz Musketeer Regiment
 von Bose Regiment
 Jaeger Korps (company)
 Unknown Artillery Company

Loyalists

 Simcoe's Rangers (Cavalry and Light Infantry)
 British Legion (Cavalry, Infantry, and Artillery elements) – Opposite Yorktown in Gloucester
 North Carolina Volunteers
 Auxiliary Local Detachments
 Pioneers
 France Volunteers

American Army
The American forces that opposed Cornwallis at Yorktown also arrived in Virginia at different times, since most of the detachments were made in reaction to the British movements.  After Arnold was sent to Virginia, General George Washington, the American commander-in-chief, in January 1781 sent the Marquis de Lafayette to Virginia with 900 men.  He was to be followed promptly by troops from the Pennsylvania Line under the command of Brigadier General Anthony Wayne, but Wayne did not arrive in Virginia until June.  Lafayette's force included a substantial number of Virginia militia, and he shadowed Cornwallis during the movements that ended at Yorktown, with a skirmish at Spencer's Ordinary and a larger battle at Green Spring being their only significant encounters.

The main Continental Army of General Washington was at first stationed outside New York City, which Washington hoped to besiege with the assistance of the French army.  However, word from Admiral Paul de Grasse of the French West Indies fleet would sail north to assist in operations on the Chesapeake Bay convinced Washington that action was best taken against Cornwallis's army in Virginia.  Accordingly, the American and French armies set out in mid-August for Virginia.  Some troops went overland the entire way; others were transported on the Chesapeake by ships of the French Navy.  Washington arrived in Lafayette's camp before Yorktown on September 17.

 Commander, General George Washington, commanding
 Headquarters
 4th Continental Light Dragoons
 Armand's Legion
 Artillery under Brigadier General Henry Knox
 1st Continental Artillery Regiment (10 company), Lieutenant Colonel Edward Carrington, Captain Whitehead Coleman
 2nd Continental Artillery Regiment (9 companies), Colonel John Lamb
 4th Continental Artillery Regiment (3 companies), Captains Patrick Duffy, William Ferguson, and James Smith
 Sappers and Miners (4 companies)
 Light Division, under Major General Marie-Joseph Paul Yves Roch Gilbert du Motier, Marquis de La Fayette
 1st Brigade, commanded by Brigadier General Peter Muhlenberg
 Colonel Joseph Vose's Battalion (8 Massachusetts light infantry companies)
 Lieutenant Colonel Jean-Joseph Sourbader de Gimat's Battalion (5 Connecticut, 2 Massachusetts, and 1 Rhode Island light infantry companies)
 Lieutenant Colonel Francis Barber's Battalion (2 New Hampshire, 2 New Jersey, and Canadian Regiment light infantry companies and 3 New Jersey line companies)
 2nd Brigade, commanded by Brigadier General Moses Hazen
 Lieutenant Colonel Alexander Scammell's battalion (2 New Hampshire, 3 Massachusetts, 3 Connecticut light infantry companies, 1 Rhode Island light platoon under Lieutenant Benjamin Sherburne)
 Lieutenant Colonel Alexander Hamilton's Battalion (2 New York light infantry companies; 2 New York and 2 Connecticut provisional light infantry companies)
Hazen's Canadian Regiment
 2nd Division, commanded by Major General Benjamin Lincoln
 1st Brigade, commanded by Brigadier General James Clinton
1st New York Regiment
2nd New York Regiment
 2nd Brigade, commanded by Colonel Elias Dayton
1st New Jersey Regiment
2nd New Jersey Regiment
Rhode Island Regiment
 3rd Division, under Major General Baron von Steuben
 1st Brigade, commanded by Brigadier General Anthony Wayne
1st Pennsylvania Battalion
2nd Pennsylvania Battalion
 2nd Brigade, commanded by Brigadier General Mordecai Gist
 3rd Maryland Regiment
4th Maryland Regiment
 Gaskins's Virginia Battalion - Major John Poulson
 Virginia Militia, commanded by Governor of Virginia, General Thomas Nelson
 Dabney's Virginia State Regiment - Lieutenant Colonel Charles Dabney
Campbell's Riflemen
 1st Brigade, commanded by Brigadier General George Weedon
Mercer's Virginia Militia Battalion
Weedon's Virginia Militia Battalion
 2nd Brigade, commanded by Brigadier General Robert Lawson
Lawson's Virginia Militia Battalion
 3rd Brigade, commanded by Brigadier General Edward Stevens
Steven's Virginia Militia Battalion

French Army
The French forces at Yorktown came from two separate sources.  The larger force, the Expédition Particulière, under the command of Lieutenant General the Comte de Rochambeau, landed at Newport, Rhode Island in 1780, and marched overland to join Washington's army outside New York in the summer of 1781.  These troops marched with Washington's army from New York to Yorktown.  More of the French troops were transported by boat on the Chesapeake than Americans, due to the French fleet commanders' preferences for transporting their own.  The second source for French troops was the Caribbean colony of Saint-Domingue (Haiti), where Admiral de Grasse picked up more than 3,000 troops under the command of Major General Claude-Anne de Rouvroy de Saint Simon before departing for North America.  The land forces were also supplemented by a number of marines provided by de Grasse in support of the siege.

The French order of battle is listed below.

 Commander Lt. Gen. Comte de Rochambeau, commanding
 Commander of Artillery Commandament d'Artillerie commanded by Lt. Col. Comte d'Aboville
2éme Bataillon du Régiment d'Auxonne (Artillery)
 4 Companies from 1ére Bataillon du Régiment de Metz (Artillery)
 Company from the Régiment de Grenoble (Artillery)

 Maj. Gen. Charles Gabriel, Baron de Viomenil's Division
Brigade Bourbonnois
Régiment de Bourbonnais (2 Battalions)
Régiment de Royal–Deux–Ponts (2 Battalions)
 Maj. Gen. Joseph Hyacinthe, Comte de Viomenil's Division
Brigade Soissonais
Régiment de Soissonnais (2 Battalions)
Régiment de Saintonge (2 Battalions)
 Maj. Gen. Marquis de St. Simon's Division
Brigade Agenois
Régiment d'Agenois (2 Battalions)
Régiment de Gatinois (2 Battalions)
 Brigade Touraine
Régiment de Touraine (2 Battalions)
 Detachment at Gloucester under Brigadier Marquis de Choisy
1ére Légion (Volontaires Étrangers de la Marine) — 4 companies of infantry and detachment of 2 guns
2éme Legion (Légion de Lauzun) — 2 Squadrons of Hussars
Corps Royal d'Infanterie de la Marine (from the squadron in the Bay)

Notes

Sources

Morrissey, Brendan (1999), Yorktown 1781: The World Turned Upside Down, Oxford, United Kingdom: Osprey Military. 
Theodore P. Savas & J. David Dameron, The New American Revolution Handbook, New York and California: Savas Beatie, 2010/2011. .
Digby Smith & Kevin F. Kiley, An Illustrated Encyclopedia of Uniforms of the American War of Independence 1775-1783, Lorenz Books. .
Ministry of Foreign Affairs, Les Combattants Français de la Guerre Américaine 1778–1783, 1903 Paris, France.

American Revolutionary War orders of battle
Yorktown campaign